Tannenbaum, and variations, may refer to:

 The German term for fir tree
 Tannenbaum, Arkansas
 "O Tannenbaum", a Christmas carol of German origin
 Operation Tannenbaum, the planned invasion of neutral Switzerland by Nazi Germany
 Tanenbaum Center for Interreligious Understanding (or simply Tanenbaum), a New York-based non-profit organization

People with the surname

Tannenbaum
 Abner Tannenbaum (1848–1913), Russian-American Yiddish journalist and writer
 Albert Tannenbaum (1906–1976), American gangster
 Allen Tannenbaum (born 1953), American/Israeli mathematician
 Barry Tannenbaum, South African businessman
 Benjamin Tannenbaum (1906–1941), New York mobster
 Elhanan Tannenbaum, former captive Israeli officer and shady businessman
 Emmanuel David Tannenbaum (1978-2012), Israeli/American biophysicist
 Frank Tannenbaum (1893–1969), American sociologist
 Judith Tannenbaum (born 1947), American teaching artist and writer
 Leonard M. Tannenbaum (born 1971), American investor 
 Micah Tannenbaum, podcaster on MuggleCast
 Mike Tannenbaum (born 1969), professional American football executive
 Rina Tannenbaum (born 1953), Israeli/American chemist
 Samuel A. Tannenbaum (1874–1948), early-20th-century literary scholar, bibliographer, and palaeographer
 זאב וואלף טענענבוים (Zev Wolf Tannenbaum) (1787–1873), a rabbi in Verpelét; see

Tanenbaum
 Andrew S. Tanenbaum (born 1944), American-Dutch computer scientist
 David Tanenbaum (guitarist) (born 1956), American classical guitarist
 Israel Tanenbaum (born 1961), Puerto Rican pianist, record producer, composer, arranger and audio engineer
 Larry Tanenbaum (born 1945), Canadian businessman
 Marc H. Tanenbaum (1925–1992), American rabbi
 Robert K. Tanenbaum, author of crime novels
 Sid Tanenbaum (1925–1986), American basketball player

Tenenbaum
 Ehud Tenenbaum (born 1979), Israeli hacker
 Gérald Tenenbaum (born 1952), French mathematician and novelist
 Jay Martin Tenenbaum, American computer scientist and Internet commerce pioneer
 Jean Ferrat (born Jean Tenenbaum), French singer
 Joel Tenenbaum, defendant in the Sony BMG v. Tenenbaum filesharing case
 Joshua Tenenbaum, American cognitive scientist
 Inez Tenenbaum (born 1951), American politician
 Edward A. Tenenbaum, American economist
 Manuel Tenenbaum (1934-2016), Uruguayan educator, historian and philanthropist
 Sergio Tenenbaum (born 1964), Canadian philosopher 
 Stephen Tenenbaum, American movie producer
 Brigid Tenenbaum, a fictional character in the video game series BioShock

Tenenbom
 Tuvia Tenenbom, theater director and author

See also
 
 
 
 

Jewish surnames